Gracia Barrios Rivadeneira (27 June 1927 – 28 May 2020) was a Chilean painter and the winner of the 2011 National Prize for Plastic Arts.

Biography
The daughter of writer Eduardo Barrios (winner of the 1946 National Prize for Literature) and pianist Carmen Rivadeneira, Gracia Barrios was interested in art from an early age. She took classes with the painter Carlos Isamitt and later, while still in school, attended evening classes at the School of Fine Arts of the University of Chile. After high school, she continued her higher education at the aforementioned university from 1944 to 1949. There she had as teachers Augusto Eguiluz, Carlos Pedraza, and Pablo Burchard, the latter having the greatest influence on her style.

Barrios began her teaching career in 1953, at her alma mater, as an assistant in the drawing workshop of Carlos Pedraza. Later she assumed other positions, until 1973. During the 1960s she belonged to Grupo Signo, which broke with post-impressionism and advocated an abandonment of easel painting. Among the other members of the group were Alberto Pérez, José Balmes, and Eduardo Martínez Bonati. In 1962 the group held exhibitions in Spain and France.

After the 1973 Chilean coup d'état, the artist went into exile in France along with her husband and daughter; they remained out of Chile for approximately ten years.

Upon returning, Barrios worked as a visiting professor at the Catholic University from 1983 to 1986, and beginning in 1994 was a professor at Finis Terrae University. She ended her teaching career some years later. "Before, art was more democratic because it revolved more around the University of Chile [...] That's why there were artists from all social spectrums. For some time, creation has gone hand in hand with economic power, with having a good surname, with moving in certain spheres. I miss doing classes, but that is one of the reasons why I left it," explained the painter.

In 2011, she won the National Prize for Plastic Arts for her work that, according to the jury, "is distinguished by its incessant search for the human condition and, above all, by the relationship of the human being with its existential and historical contexts."

Work

The work of Gracia Barrios focuses on "human activity in everyday life." Although she initially opted for figurative painting, towards the 1960s she changed to a more informal style, called "informal realism" by the artist herself. With this, Barrios alluded to the man "by means of the monumentality of torsos, heads, and maternities, expressing also the direct approach with the American continent and its people." Some of the themes she tackled in her paintings were war, indigence, and exile.

In addition to using oil and acrylic paints, the artist experimented with natural elements such as earth and clay in order to give greater density to her works.

Her paintings have been exhibited in countries such as Spain, France, Germany, Brazil, and Japan, and adorn not only Chilean museums, but also some European ones, such as the Barcelona Museum of Contemporary Art and the André Malraux Museum of Le Havre.

Personal life
In 1943, while attending free courses at the University of Chile, Barrios met the Catalan painter José Balmes. They were introduced by the poet Enrique Lihn. They married in 1952 and had a daughter, Concepción Balmes, who is also a painter.

Garcia Barrios died on 28 May 2020 at the age of 92.

Awards and recognitions

 1957 – First Prize for Drawing, 68th Official Salon, Santiago
 1958 – Second Prize for Painting, 69th Official Salon, Santiago
 1959 – Second Prize, 70th Official Salon, Santiago
 1964 – Second Prize, Esso Salon, Museum of Contemporary Art, University of Chile, Santiago
 1965 – First CRAV Prize for Painting, Santiago
 1965 – Second Prize, Painting, Esso Salon for Young Artists, Pan American Union, Washington, United States
 1966 – First Prize for Painting, 76th Official Salon, Santiago
 1968 – Second Prize, American Biennial of Quito, Ecuador
 1971 – Prize of Honor of the 15th Ñuñoa Salon, Santiago
 1988 – Achievement Award, Mural of the Worker's Hospital, Santiago
 1996 – Municipal Art Prize, Municipality of Santiago
 2011 – National Prize for Plastic Arts

References

1927 births
2020 deaths
20th-century Chilean painters
21st-century Chilean painters
20th-century Chilean women artists
21st-century Chilean women artists
Artists from Santiago
Chilean exiles
Chilean people of Portuguese descent
Art Informel and Tachisme painters
Academic staff of the Pontifical Catholic University of Chile
University of Chile alumni
Chilean women painters